Ish-Blloku, commonly Blloku, is an upmarket area in Tirana, Albania. It widely known as an entertainment destination with its boutiques, shops, restaurants, trendy bars, pubs, and cafes. The area is part of the neighbourhood of Tirana e Re in southwestern Tirana. During the peak summer months, its trendy bars transfer along the Albanian Riviera.

It became very attractive after the fall of Communism in Albania, because during the communist period it was a restricted residential area for the members of the Albanian politburo, ordinary Albanians would not be allowed in. On most maps it was unmarked. In Bllokux one can still find the residence of Albania’s communist leader Enver Hoxha.

Since the fall of communism in Albania, a dramatic growth of new developments has taken place, with many new exclusive flats and apartments. Ish-Blloku has been called the "playground of the young Albanian elite".

Blloku is quite a small, walking neighborhood, easily accessible from different parts of Tirana. The entrance of Blloku is only 10–15 minutes by foot from the city centre of Tirana.

The first international fast food chain (KFC) in Albania, were also opened at Ish-Blloku and Tirana East Gate.

 Landmarks in Tirana
 Neighborhoods of Tirana

Further information 
 
Albania Fashion Street Blog
Tirana Club Zone 
Till'late Albania
Radio Stations in Tirana

References 

Neighbourhoods of Tirana
Entertainment districts
Tourist attractions in Tirana